Supa Strikas is a pan-African association football-themed comic, about the titular football team dubbed "the world's greatest." Despite their enormous talent, the players must adapt in a game where being the best is only the beginning and where the opposition is always full of surprises—the Supa Strikas comic prints 1.4 million copies per month in 16 countries. Supa Strikas also appeared on Caltex and Texaco as an ad. As of 2019, the franchise is currently owned by Moonbug Entertainment.

The comic's global headline sponsor is Chevron (the Caltex and Texaco brands appear on Supa Strikas' match and training apparel), with other headline sponsors including Visa, Guaranty Trust Bank and Henkel. Partner sponsors also feature depending on region, including Grassroot Soccer, Metropolitan Life, Spur Steak Ranches, Visa, South African National Roads Agency, and MTN amongst others.

Sponsors exposure includes perimeter boards in-game scenes, product placement / engagement (e.g. the team often eats at KFC in the South African edition), and full-page advertisements. It is currently sponsored by KFC and Old Mutual in South Africa.

History and development 
Supa Strikas was founded by Andrew Smith, Oliver Power, Lee Hartman, and Alex Kramer The comic series was first published in South Africa in 2000, following the format of the British comic Roy of the Rovers. Afterward publication spread to various sub-Saharan African countries. By 2002 publications in the neighbouring countries of Namibia, Botswana, Zambia. Nigeria, Kenya, Tanzania and Uganda soon followed.

The comic receives sponsorship from several companies, including Nike, Caltex, and other South African businesses. Consequently, the sponsoring firms have their product names placed on various panels.

The series was based on the life of Thuthuka "Terry" Zwane, a boy from the Soweto area of Johannesburg. With demand for the comic growing increasingly global, Supa Strikas’ core characters remained local, but a more international cast grew around them, including characters of Asian, Latin American and European extraction.

Today, the comic is available across Africa (South Africa, Namibia, Botswana, Zambia, Kenya, Uganda, Tanzania, Mauritius, Réunion, Nigeria, Ghana, Cameroon and Egypt); Latin America (Colombia, El Salvador, Panama, Brazil, Honduras, and Guatemala); Europe (Norway, Sweden, Finland) and Asia (Malaysia and the Philippines).

The comic has also been adapted into an animated series by Animasia Studios. The series debuted in 2009 with 47 episodes – each with approximately 22 minutes of run-time – and aired in selected regions until 2010.

The titular soccer team adventure through the world of soccer in their bid to win the Super League trophy in their country, dubbed in their stadium "Strikaland." On their way across the globe, the team explores the roots of the game (from Mexico to China), meets its most extraordinary past and present players, and confronts the most unscrupulous coaches and players from their rival teams.

The story centers around the team's young striker, Shakes, whom many believe is the best striker in the world. Shakes and his teammates, however, consider the acclaim as a mere beginning. The game's global legacy and the players who dream of being crowned Super League champions mean Shakes must constantly challenge himself to remain in contention. As a result, he often finds himself spearheading the team's exploration of the unknown – be it a strange land, a strange opposition, or a new soccer challenge.

The stories in Supa Strikas combine humor (often in the form of the character Spenza as the comic relief), action, technology, and exploration in the context of a real soccer challenge. In addition, the stories are usually positive life messages that deal with self-actualization, fair play, teamwork, and respect.

Characters

Shakes
Shakes is the youngest member and the star striker of Supa Strikas from South Africa, though he could play as a defender. His strength is a lethal combination of skill and determination. He is also capable of solving problems when they are on the edge of losing during halftime. He inherits his No. 10 jerseys from his father, Jomo, who was deemed one of the greatest players in the team's history. Because of Jomo's reputation within the team, Shakes faces anxiety about living up to his father's legacy. His desire to prove himself often spurs him into engaging in impulsive or reckless actions. Shakes might not know what he is getting himself into, but he is prepared for any challenge. His signature moves are bicycle kicks and knuckleballs. Shakes' best friend is Spenza. He also has a younger sister called Nandi as seen in the new episodes of Rookie season.

El Matador
El Matador  is Shakes' s attacking striking partner from Spain who wears the number 20
jersey. He is the most expensive player in the Super League. He tends to be melodramatic, and he is often seen wearing aqua sunglasses. He is also known as a 'El Matador'. Fighter is incredibly self-absorbed, being the wealthiest player on the team. He owns two gold Lamborghini Gallardo LP 560–4, one Coupe and one Spyder, both nicknamed "Bruno." His other cars include a purple Lamborghini roadster with red chrome, a black and silver two-tone Rolls-Royce Ghost, a silver Nissan GT-R NISMO, a bright green McLaren 570S, a blue Cadillac Coupe de Ville, and a red Aston Martin One-77. He likes to live a lavish lifestyle. El Matador is regarded as one of the best players in the Super League and is one of the highest-scoring players. In the Hindi dub he is known as Fighter and Milosz is a frajer

Klaus
Klaus von Jurgen Ulf Gutentag, nicknamed Klaus, is a backup striker for Supa Strikas from Germany who wears the number 2 jersey, he is also very kiddish. Klaus has a ling blond hair. In some episodes, he was seen playing as a defender. Klaus has excellent passing techniques and terrorizes tired opposition defense as a super substitute. He puts on a vulnerable and comical facade to lower the opponents' expectations of his playing, yet he is dead serious when scoring goals. Klaus tends to sneeze when nervous. His favorite food is strudel. Klaus always buys his Aunt Hilda presents from every city Supa Strikas visits. He is addicted to the Inspector Von Spectre series and believes that the butler is always guilty.

Dancing Rasta

Jah "Dancing" Rasta is the Jamaican captain of Supa Strikas. He wears the number 9 jersey and is a seasoned mountaineer. His captaincy skills are put to the test when facing tough opponents such as Dooma or Johann Uber. He is very polite and does not harm others without, even with a cause. Most fans believe he is the greatest captain in the Super League. He is very motivational. He is also called captain by his other teammates. He has coulrophobia so he is afraid of clowns, but he still takes his children to the circuses nevertheless.

Big Bo
Bojack "Big Bo" Anderson is the main goalkeeper and vice-captain of Supa Strikas. Big Bo wears the number 1 jersey. He is often claimed as the greatest goalkeeper in the league, even better than De Los Santos. He is from Middleton, Texas, in the United States, and Supa Strikas is his 3rd team. He has won many awards as a goalkeeper. Before joining Supa Strikas, Big Bo accidentally injured the former Grimm FC player Spike "Awesome" Dawson out of his soccer career. Dawson refuses to accept Big Bo's apology and is obsessed with getting his revenge on Big Bo. Since the prisoner Knuckles who impersonated Big Bo was arrested, the real Big Bo was not charged for his prison escape conspiracy, since Big Bo was imprisoned by mistake.

Twisting Tiger 
Twisting Tiger is a right-footed winger and midfielder from Japan who wears the number 16 jersey. He previously played for Nakama FC. He is known for his accurate shooting and is one of the best players in Supa Strikas. Twisting Tornado and the upside-down Twisting Tornado are his signature moves. Twisting Tiger learned Japanese football style from his former coach Ura Giri. His former teammate, Miko Chen of Nakama FC, is like a brother to him. Tiger is known to be the quickest player on the field, and zooms past other players with ease. He believes that his lucky charm helps Supa Strikas in their matches. Unfortunately, he broke his arms, and thus is seen with bandages.

Cool Joe
Josef "Cool Joe" Garzia is a Brazilian left-wing midfielder who wears the number 7 jersey. Known as the "king of crossing" following his excellent crosses, also known for his spins, which helped the team to score many goals. He also has a flair for disco music, crediting one record for giving his "groove" during the game. Cool Joe also owns a disco club known as Cool Joe's. He has five signature spins: "The left spin, the right spin, the backspin, and the topspin" that are unpredictable in the field. The fifth spin, the corkscrew, is very different from the rest as it was developed by a table tennis champion, Chill John.

North Shaw
Killian "North" Shaw is an Australian player who is a first-choice defender alongside Blok. He wears the number 8 jersey. His personality is described as a surfer who owns a beach shop and rides 'gnarly' waves. North Shaw sports a blonde afro hairstyle and eyebrows. His signature move is 'The Slide,' sliding to retrieve the ball from the opposition's feet. He is frenemies with Liquido of FC Hydra.

Blok
Jozef "Blok" Rybar is North Shaw's defensive partner who wears the 55 jersey. He is from the fictional country of Brislovia, named after Bratislava and Slovakia. He is nicknamed "Blok," following his ability to "block" the ball very well. He is also a capable striker. He is rather terse, which is in stark contrast with his rather talkative teammates. However, most people cannot understand him when he speaks because he communicates almost exclusively in Brislovian, though he understands English. Blok's brother, Miroslav "Attak" Rybar, plays as a striker for FC Technicali.

Eagle Eye
Eagle Eye is the reserve defender Supa Strikas FC starting and wears a number 4 jersey. He is called Eagle Eye for he has sharp eyes that allow him to intercept the strikers from scoring. Eagle Eye is a native American from Las Vegas and used to play for FC Cosmos. He is close with the other young defenders, North Shaw and Blok. He has a high ability to score long-range goals. Eagle Eye is the oldest player in Supa Strikas.

Lankey
Lankey is a substitute striker for El Matador, hailing from England. He is very tall and skinny and wears the number 23 jersey. He is a bit nervous when he gets the ball but always tries to do his best as a striker.

Griz
Griz is a substitute defender for North Shaw and wears the number 6 jersey. He has a tendency to vomit out of fear or nervousness about intense matches. He has orange hair and sometimes wears a headband. He is still a capable defender.

Rizo
Rizo is a substitute midfielder mostly for Rasta or any of the wing midfielders, or sometimes even the forwards. He wears the number 3 jersey. He is not like other substitutes, because he is very serious in his game.

Aldo 
Aldo was another player in Supa Strikas with jersey 19. He is a spare midfielder.
he is also capable but is not good at shooting or defending so that is why he does not play.

Noah Murdoch
Noah is the substitute goalkeeper for Big Bo with jersey number 13. He is a solid keeper but he is usually injured by the opposition.

Coach
David Ledige is the coach of Supa Strikas hailing from Kenya. He is often deemed to be the greatest coach in the Super League. Coach is also considered one of the greatest players of all time, played for Supa Strikas wearing the number 11 jersey during his younger days, and has a reputation for playing in all positions. Coach has been inducted into the Museum of Soccer and two other great players, Edwin and Golare. He is strongly notable for his tactics and his strategies.

Spenza
Spenza is Shakes's childhood best friend and a superfan of Supa Strikas. As a private investigator, he often helps Supa Strikas solve their problems on the field, particularly on sabotages from rival teams. He is always seen wearing a white hat and a magnifying glass at hand, and he loves to eat. He was a mechanic in earlier days.

Supa Fran Francheska
Francheska, also known as Supa Fran, is a supporting character in seven episodes who appears to be Spenza's girlfriend. She is a huge fan of El Matador and Dancing Rasta. She appears in the episodes "El Sound of Silencio," "Dooma's Day," "The 12th Man", "Hot Property," "With Fans Like These," "Greetings From Sunny Feratuvia," "The Crunch," and "Game Over." She once rallied fans of Supa Strikas to gather outside the stadiums when they got unfairly banned from a match due to violence.

Mac
Mac is an Argentinian commentator for soccer games, who formerly played in the Super League as a defender. He usually acts crazy and immaturely.

Brenda
Brenda is Mac's co-commentator from Portugal. Brenda is much more mature than Mac but joins in the craziness at times. She appears in all the episodes from season 2.

Jacques Cousteau
Jacques Cousteau is a French chef working for Supa Strikas. He is annoyed at his job with Supa Strikas because he could not show his culinary skills and was forced to cook diet food.

Albert
Albert is Big Bo's loyal butler. He makes a minor appearance in "Big Bo Lockdown", but in "Big Bo to Go" and "Scare Tactics", he makes a major appearance when he helps the protagonist.

Formation
Supa Strikas play with 10 men relevant on the team with the eleventh one being either Griz or Rizo. Their formation is 3-3-1-2.

The Supa Strikas formation is as follows:
1. Big Bo (Goalkeeper)
4. Eagle Eye (Defender, Right back)
55. Blok (Defender, Left back)
8. North Shaw (Defender, Centre Back)
7. Cool Joe (Midfielder, Left Winger)
16. Twisting Tiger (Midfielder, Right Winger)
9. Dancing Rasta (Midfielder, Captain)
2. Klaus (Attacking Midfielder)
10. Shakes (Striker)
20. El Matador (Striker)

Substitutes
23. Lankey (Striker)
3. Rizo (Midfielder)
6. Griz (Defender)
13. Noah Murdoch (Goalkeeper)

Episodes 
(NOTE: These episodes are related to T.V. series)

Season 1

Season 2

Season 3

Season 4

Season 5

Season 6

Season 7

Teams
These are the teams in the Supa Strikas series. Teams include:

Invincible United
Invincible United are the main antagonists from South Africa of Italian origins. They are Supa Strikas's biggest rivals. They were the best team in the league and the meanest and the most dishonest team in the Super League. Their coach is Vince and the team's lead striker, and the captain is Samson "Skarra" Mazuel, who was once Shakes's best friend until Shakes qualified for Supa Strikas. Starting from Season 3, Episode 39, and Season 5, Skarra was replaced by Dooma as the team's captain due his pride preventing him from doing actual teamwork. Invincible United players are Automatic, known for his powerful throw-ins; Dingaan, the team's primary defender; Snake; and their goalkeeper, The Web. Their home stadium is called The Vice, with a capacity of 60,000. The Façade and the general design of The Vice is based upon the Colosseum in Rome.

Sultans FC
Sultans FC represents the United Arab Emirates. They are the wealthiest team in the Super League. The team's former star players were the Amal 3, Aziz, Akbar, and Alam. Upon their signing, the Amal 3 were the most expensive footballers in the Super League. Sultans lead striker, and the captain is Zoom Zahir. Other players include Eduardo, Erikson, and their goalkeeper, Fast Farouk. Their coach is Sheikh Ali Zaman (Arabic: علي زمان), who is a wealthy royal. The team is also known for often tricking people into unfair games and competition. Sultans home stadium is the Goliath Stadium, with a capacity of 150,000, in the middle of the desert.

Colossus
Colossus is the team from Greece. The team's name is reflected in the size of the players, often vast and colossal. Their coach is Nick Kickalopolous (Greek: Νικ Κικκαλοπολους), and Demitrius is the team's central striker. Other players include Bemus, Parseus, Hermes, Achilles, and their goalkeeper, Titan. Their stadium is the Olympii Stadium and the stadium capacity is 65,000.

Orion FC
Orion FC is a French team based in Paris. The team's specialty is airborne play. Their coach, Professor Black, is crazy about space observation and exploration. Orion's lead striker is Andre Meda. Other players include Max and Stax Spacek, Ben Schwarma, Niell Sagan, and their goalkeeper, D'etoile Phinus. Their home stadium is called The Soccersphere, with a capacity of 65,000. The basement of The Soccersphere has a zero-gravity chamber, which Shakes stumbles upon.

Hydra FC
Hydra FC also represents France. They are known as the fastest team in the Super League. The team is also noted for using technologies on playing matches, tilting the stadium when needed, which qualifies as cheating. Their coach is Alfredo Del Aqua, and Giorgio Liquido is the team's lead midfielder. The team's captain is Skipper, and its goalkeeper is The Plug. Other known players of the team include Shane Fin, Ripple White, and Joe Mamoa. Hydra's stadium is called the Floating Stadium as it is built on an ocean. The stadium has a capacity of 69,000.

Barka FC
Barka FC is a team representing Spain located in Barcelona and is loosely based on FC Barcelona. Their lead striker and the captain is Riano, a fair and honest player, based upon Lionel Messi. Their legendary players are Golare (named after Pep Guardiola) and El Ariete, who is now a header coach. Other known team players are Balito, Enrique, Jordi, Mendez, Paulo and goalkeeper, El Barerra. Barka's home ground is called Faux Camp (based on Camp Nou), and its capacity is 58,000.

Iron Tank FC
Iron Tank FC is a team from Germany, and its players are made up of former and active members of the Bundeswehr. Their coach is Colonel Von Pushup, their lead defender and the captain is Johann Uber, their lead striker is Thor, their lead midfielder is Von Eye, and their goalkeeper is The Mangler. Other known players of Iron Tank are Ja Nein, a tech-savvy player, who often tricks and hypnotizes his teammates, and Erin, a substitute player. They are considered the most formidable and strongest team that the Super League has ever seen. They are the third strongest behind Supa Strikas and Invincible United. Their home stadium is called The Fortress Stadium, the 4th biggest stadium after Goliath Stadium, Ramba Stadium, and Strikaland, with a capacity of 75,000. The stadium is located high in the Alps, constantly covered in snow. While playing in The Fortress Stadium, opposition players and match officials wear unique clothing, and a bright orange ball is used. The high altitude results in opposition players experiencing nausea.

Nakama FC
Nakama FC is the team representing Japan. The team is composed of karate and ninjutsu practitioners. Nakama's coach is Ura Giri (Japanese: ウラギリ), who publicly supports discipline and fair play and has even made the motto, "Honor and Trust,"; but in reality, he resorts to dirty play when his team could be defeated. Their lead striker is Miko Chen. Other known players of Nakama are Yugiro, Shinji, Keita, Kylo, Eddy Nakamura, Enzo Honda, Goji Ao, and their goalkeeper, Kendo. Nakama FC is Twisting Tiger's former team. The team's stadium is Ga Shuku Stadium and has a capacity of 70,000.

FC Technicali
FC Technicali is a team from Los Angeles, United States. Their coach is 'The Inventor' Toni Vern. Their lead striker and the captain is Chuck T. Chipperson, John J. Johnson Jr. is the team's lead midfielder, and Benedict B. Bradley is their goalkeeper. Other known players of the team are Thaddeus Tarrington III, Kyle Kowalski, Rocky George, and Blok's brother, Attak. The team uses technology during games and is one of the most notorious cheaters in the Super League, after Invincible United. FC Technicali's home stadium is Technical Stadium, sometimes referred to as The Hub, and has a capacity of 68,000.

Grimm FC
Grimm FC is Romanian team located in Feratuvia. Their coach is Coach Belmont, and the team's legend is Spike "Awesome" Dawson from the United States. Their lead midfielder and the captain is Vladimir Savich (Serbian:Владимир Савич) from Serbia. Other known team players are Scully Molder, Bones Jones, Rip Staples, Sloan Wolff and goalkeeper, Franklin Stein. Grim FC often uses Halloween tricks to scare the oppositions. The team's most prized possession is a book called the Tactanomicon, written by the team's former coaches. Grimm FC's home stadium is called The Cauldron, with a capacity of 40,000.

Cognito FC
Cognito FC is an English team from Manchester. Their lead striker is Judge Caleb, an English footballer. Other players include Archie Tipp, Rory Shanks, Karl Young, Udi Pass, and their goalkeeper, Pavlov Jashin. Their coach is In-Yo, the only female coach in The Super League. In-Yo has a bitter-sweet past experience with Twisting Tiger and his ex-teammate Miko Chen. Their stadium is The Headquarters, with a capacity of 75,000. They have only appeared in two episodes, 'Hot Property' and 'Mind Over Matador.'

Cosmos FC
Cosmos FC hails from Las Vegas, United States. Their coach is Buddy Watkins, who owns the Buckingham Palace Hotel in Las Vegas. Their lead players are Ninja, an offensive player, and Bolo, a defensive player. Other team players are the team's captain Emilio, Scissors, Airborne, Scorpion, Jag, and goalkeeper Keller. Their stadium is The Universe with a capacity of 65,000.

Clube Palmentieri
Clube Palmentieri is a team representing Brazil. The team is based on Palmeiras in São Paulo. The team's style of play is The Palma Way, taught by the team's legend, Edwin, who in later episodes is their coach. They have good accuracy, speed, and balance and are known as the Samba Kings. Palmentieri's lead striker and the captain is Don Aldo( based on great striker Ronaldo de Lima). Other known players are Rick, Cruz, Melo, Felipe, and goalkeeper, Julio (based on Júlio César). Their home stadium is the Ramba Stadium and has a capacity of 100,000.

Azul FC
Azul FC is a team from Mexico and is loosely based from Cruz Azul. Their manager is Honcho Gomez. Their best player and captain is goalkeeper De Los Santos, known for his remarkably huge size but can easily save almost every ball. Other players include Tomas, Santiago, Pablo, Estevez, and Leonardo. Their home is called Aztec Stadium, based on Aztec Stadium with a capacity of 45,000.

Sa Ming United
Sa Ming United is a team from China. They only appeared in the first two seasons. They are considered as one of the weaker teams in the league. Their lead striker is Sa Ma Wee  (Korean: 사마위) from South Korea.

FC Lokomotiv
FC Lokomotiv is a team from Russia and is based on FC Lokomotiv Moscow. This team has been mentioned only once during the match against Azul in 'Communication Blok.' This team is very much unknown and has not faced Supa Strikas in any episodes and it once appeared on the episode when they were coached by "Ndinani Jako" from South Africa

Littleton FC
Littleton FC is Big Bo's former team. They only appeared in two episodes, 'Big Bo To Go' and 'Own Ghoul.'

FC All Star
FC All-Star is an all-star team consisting of lead players from the teams faced by Supa Strikas. The team captain is Skarra. This team only appeared in the final episode of Season 2, 'Bringing Down the House'. It consists of all the best players on super league.
The team-
De Los Santos(goalkeeper)(Azul FC),
Ninja(Cosmos FC),
Bolo(Cosmos FC),
Johann Uber(Iron Tank FC),
Miko Chen(Nakama FC),
Don Aldo(Clube Palmentieri),
Giorgio Liquido(Hydra FC),
Andre Meda(Orion FC),
Riano(Barka FC),
Skarra(captain)(Invincible United)

See also

South African comics

References

External links

 
 Supa Strikas Kenya - Official Mobi Site (Offline)
 Strika Entertainment Corporate Website
 Supa Strikas Official YouTube Channel

Comics publications
Comics adapted into television series
Association football comics
South African comics
Fictional association football clubs
Moonbug Entertainment